Ejército Revolucionario del Pueblo (ERP) or Ejército Popular Revolucionario (EPR) may refer to:
 People's Revolutionary Army (Argentina)
 People's Revolutionary Army (Colombia)
 People's Revolutionary Army (El Salvador)
 People's Revolutionary Army (Mexico)